Imoinu or Emoinu is a goddess associated with household, hearth, family, fireplace, kitchen, wealth, peace and prosperity in Meitei mythology and religion of Ancient Kangleipak (Antique Manipur). She is frequently associated with Leimarel Sidabi. She is regarded as one of the incarnations or representations of goddess Leimarel Sidabi.

In Meitei mythology, Imoinu is known for her sense of humor. Generally, she is portrayed as "an old woman", as her name means "great grandmother" in Meitei language.

The personality of Imoinu and other goddesses like Panthoibi and Phouoibi depict as well as influence the boldness, courage, independence, righteousness and social honour of Meitei women.

Etymology and nomenclature 

The meaning of the name "Emoinu Ahongbi" ("ꯏꯃꯣꯢꯅꯨ ꯑꯍꯣꯡꯕꯤ") can be found by splitting it up word by word. Here, "E" ("ꯏ") refers to human being. "Moi" ("ꯃꯣꯢ" or "ꯃꯣꯏ") refers to rearing. "Nu" ("ꯅꯨ") refers to female deity or goddess. So, "Emoinu" means goddess who rears the human beings. "Ahongbi" means giver of plentiful household properties.

The name Imoinu (Emoinu) stands for the goddess rearing the human beings. The first-word syllable E (/ee/) means human beings, moi (/moy/) meaning rearing and nu meaning Goddess.

Ahongbi means giver of the household properties plentifully. Ibendhou (Ebendhou) meaning great-grandmother.

Description 
Dr. Parratt described Emoinu Ahongbi (alias Emoinu Ahong Achaubi) as another form of Goddess Leimarel Sidabi. Leimarel Sidabi is the supreme mother. Imoinu is regarded as an ever resourceful lady. She always gives wealth and prosperity to the mankind. She was shown as having a human appearance. She resides near the fire hearth. The goddess is believed to be the controller and regulator of good conduct and behavior of the human beings.

Imoinu Ahong Achaubi is a deity for good moral behavior, besides wealth and prosperity. As a social code of conduct, a Meitei woman should go out from home only after prayers and worship of the goddess and other household deities. When she returns home, she should pray to the deity.

The Meitei people believed that goddess Imoinu lives in the houses of those who strictly obey her favorite social and moral behavior norms. Imoinu blesses such people with nungai yaifaba (well being and prosperity), watta padaba (having neither shortage nor excess), tekta kaidaba (unaffected by troubles of life) and punshi nungshangba (long life). These are the basic needs of life in the human world.

Texts 

There are many ancient texts which mentioned the description of the deity. A few of them include "Emoinu Tengtharol", "Emoinu Mingkheirol", "Yumsharol", "Malem Chukkhong Puya" and so on.
An excerpt from the hymns depicting goddess Emoinu goes like this :

Emoinu Lairelbigi Tengtharol 
Hayahe Lahannong Korou Longlon taret
Malem Leirol taret houngeida
Amam Leishinarapi Atinga Shidabagi pukning
amamba anganba awangbadagi matam ahum machu ahumdagi louduna
shidabagi Ee tangkhai oithangba shakhaidagi shakhiye haibagi Emoinu kouye .
Atinga ahangbada hongna chaona thoklakle haibagi Ahong Achoubi kouye.
Hayi-ngei taibang yumthong laipham arubada leirure.
Mangangda yahoure ,
Luwangda yahipnare,
khumanda chaktanare;
Iyakham,Inukham,
Leimaloisang karong phabi kouye.
And in another hymn, the goddess is addressed like this:
He Ima leishirel leipunbi ,
Leimarel shawon oiribi .
Achi tat-tabi Athong kangdabi;
Emoinu Ahong Achaobi.
Tara chakning khakna chakshoubi,
Wanglei yenning khakna yenshoubi.
Wayel wangam thourangbi ,
Huyel lancheng Shaphabi.
Ingi khutchingli oiribi,
Pegi chahum oiribi .
Heepokpi ,Yaipokpi Heeleima,
Yaileima ,Heekubi Yaikubi
Yaishna kouna mingkheibi;
Leima taret shawonbi.
Naktha leima paotoibi ,
Phurep leima luchaobi.
Phurep changjou oiribi,
Phuron wanlon-nungda yatabi.
Ayuk chara nongdambi.
Numidang chara nongkhaibi .
Taibang naoyok naokonbio!
He Ima haosham tongdamnabi,
Emoinu ahong achaobio!
Areinu leishinbirak-o ,ahumnu humjinbirak-o!
Kangla chira marimaktagi ,
Malem maikei nipalmaktagi.
Ingi khurji ching-bagum chingshinbiyu,
Pegi chahum shup-pagum shupchinbiyu.
Achi tatpiganu akhong kangbiganu.
Tara chakning khakna chakshoubiyu,
Wanglei yen-ning khakna yenshoubiyu.
He Ima! Nganglou thambal manba ,
Khoimom shana nakhongkhada,
Taibang nongshapangi nadairem wakmana,
Manbi khutapnana mukmu leiton kon
Kaobi chira luk malem thourei leika paina.
Changjou leipaknana khoimom nakhongkhada,
Chepna non-na purumjari.
Hung pokpi hung pokpi tu
Takup takup haoku haokup
Leihipun tarengching heeng koubi;
Thup thup koubi layolang tanoubi koubi Ima!
Lengshinbiyu , nanaina katchabashi loubiyu,

Lengdana leibiyu Ima!
This is a common hymn dedicated to goddess Emoinu, chanted by devotees during her worshipping rituals.

Mythology 
According to ancient Meitei text "Lairembi Nongumlol", the Sky God Salailen Sidaba has seven daughters, whom he sent them down to earth to prosper the human civilization. All the goddesses were given a certain task to serve in their future. In that event, a goddess was given the task to be associated with peace, wealth and prosperity. Later, she came to be known as "Emoinu Ahongbi".

Origin 
After the creation of the sky and the planets, Sidaba (the Supreme Being) ordered His wife, Leimarel Sidabi (the first woman) to produce another Leimarel. The second Leimarel would be the second woman. Her responsibility was to take care of the mankind on the planet called earth. Goddess Leimarel Sidabi obeyed her divine husband's order. She created another Leimarel. The appearance of the second Leimarel was similar to the first Leimarel. The first Leimarel named the second Leimarel as "Emoinu Ahongbi".

Lover 
Once goddess Imoinu fell in love with a man. The two became lovers. They swore to be husband and wife. One day, she visited his house in his absence. She discovered that he was already married to another woman. After knowing this, she sacrificed her love. She swore on not to see the man again. She never married to anyone. So, she remained as a virgin goddess.

Worship

Ancient worship 
Imoinu (Emoinu) is a hearth deity. She is annually worshipped on the 12th of the Meitei month of Wakching (December–January interface month). Despite this annual event, she is also worshipped everyday. The daily worship is a part of a Meitei ritual. It is done in every Meitei household with the offering of little cooked rice before eating.

Modern worship 
Nowadays, there is little or no households with proper phunga lairu (traditional fire hearth). So, a modern fireplace is developed. Here, traditional rites and rituals are performed in honor of the goddess.

There are a lot of changes in the way of worshipping Goddess Imoinu. However, the essence and the importance always remain the same as forever.

Abode 
There are two major places in a household where the deity could be worshipped:-
 One abode is at the fireplace "Phunga Lairu" of the kitchen of the household.
 Another place is at the "Sanamahi Kachin", the South western corner of the household.

Ritual 
Ebendhou Emoinu is offered from the first serving of every meal prepared in a Meitei household. The serving is made by placing three servings of the cooked rice on a plate that is set aside. These offerings should be only vegetarian foods or fish.

The household members are asked to maintain discipline, be respectful, and be tidy so as to please Emoinu.

Festival 

The Imoinu Iratpa (Emoinu Eratpa) is a religious festival dedicated to goddess Imoinu (Emoinu). It is celebrated on the 12th of Wakching month (December–January interface month) every year. Traditionally, worship and prayers are performed inside every households. Nowadays, Imoinu Iratpa festival is also celebrated in a larger way in public gathering clubs also.

Wherever the festival is performed, seasonal fruits, vegetables and fish are offered to goddess Imoinu.

Imoinu Iratpa is observed every 12th day of the Meitei lunar month, Waakching (Dec-Jan in gregorian calendar). On this day, especially at night, Emoinu is offered what each can, particularly fish curries as dinner for Emoinu and a variety of cuisines in odd numbers.

Namesakes

In commerce 
Ima Keithel is the world's only women run market. It has three major building complexes. Imoinu Ima Keithel is the Complex Number 2 of the market. It is preceded by Leimarel Sidabi Ima Keithel (Complex Number 1) and followed by Phouoibi Ima Keithel (Complex Number 3). This 500 years old market is in the center of Imphal, Manipur.

See also
 Lainingthou Sanamahi
 Pakhangba
 Atingkok Maru Sidaba
 Lists of deities in Sanamahism
 Lists of Creatures in Meitei Folklore
 Sanamahi creation myth
 Sacred Scriptures of Sanamahism

References

Bibliography 
 Emoinu Ahongbi Tungnapham by Budhichandra, Yumnamcha
 Holy Man by Dhiren Meitei,a.k
 Laiyingthou Lairemmasinggee Waree Seengbul by Neelabi, Sairem
 Leeklam by Apunba Shintha Lup

External links 

 E-pao, Imoinu
 E-pao, Emoinu
 Internet Archive, Imoinu
 Internet Archive, Emoinu
 Learners' Manipuri-English dictionary, Imoinu

Abundance deities
Abundance goddesses
Beauty deities
Beauty goddesses
Commerce deities
Commerce goddesses
Crafts deities
Crafts goddesses
Domestic and hearth deities
Domestic and hearth goddesses
Fertility deities
Fertility goddesses
Fire deities
Fire goddesses
Food deities
Food goddesses
Fortune deities
Fortune goddesses
Harvest deities
Harvest goddesses
Health deities
Health goddesses
Leima
Life-death-rebirth deities
Life-death-rebirth goddesses
Love and lust deities
Love and lust goddesses
Magic deities
Magic goddesses
Maintenance deities
Maintenance goddesses
Meitei deities
Names of God in Sanamahism
Peace deities
Peace goddesses
Time and fate deities
Time and fate goddesses
Virgin deities
Virgin goddesses
Wisdom deities
Wisdom goddesses